Hainan cuisine, or Hainanese cuisine, is derived from the cooking styles of the peoples of Hainan Province in China. The food is lighter, less oily, and more mildly seasoned than that of the Chinese mainland. Seafood predominates the menu, as prawn, crab, and freshwater and ocean fish are widely available.

Congee, mantou and baozi are eaten for breakfast, with a noodle dish also being widely eaten. This consists of fine, vermicelli-type noodles with various toppings and gravy. Along with lunch and dinner, late night outdoor barbecue dishes are also served.

Four Most Famous Dishes in Hainan Cuisine

Other notable dishes

See also

 Chinese cuisine
 List of Chinese dishes

References

External links
 Images of Hainan dishes
 Images of Wenchang chicken, and other signature Hainan dishes

 
Regional cuisines of China